The Ocean Island Railway (later Banaba Island Railway) was a  long guano mining railway with a gauge of initially , and after 1937 of 
and finally  on Ocean Island (later renamed Banaba Island).

Route 
The track ran from the northern guano mining areas along the coast through the European Settlement (English:Tabwewa, French: Tapiwa) and the Native Labour Quarters (Tabiang, Tapiang) to the depot and Boat Harbour (Uma, Ooma).

Operation 
Initially steam locomotives of Orenstein & Koppel (O&K) and a saddle tank locomotive of Bagnall were used. One O&K locomotive was named Florence, one had the number 7 (O&K works number 12678 of 1935) and another one the number 11 (O&K works number 9880 of 1922).

Later diesel locomotives were used. Passenger transport was done with a canopee car for the Europeans and an open wagon for the native labourers.

Locomotives

References 

2 ft gauge railways in Kiribati
Standard gauge railways
Defunct railroads
Kiribati